Agathylla is a genus of gastropods belonging to the family Clausiliidae.

The species of this genus are found in Europe, Japan.

Species:

Agathylla abrupta 
Agathylla biloba 
Agathylla exarata 
Agathylla formosa 
Agathylla goldi 
Agathylla lamellosa 
Agathylla narentana 
Agathylla neutra 
Agathylla regularis 
Agathylla strigillata 
Agathylla sulcosa 
Agathylla viperina

References

Clausiliidae